Mapleton is a city in Utah County, Utah, United States. It is part of the Provo–Orem Metropolitan Statistical Area. The population was 11,365 at the 2020 census.

History
The area was first settled in 1850, and for a time was known as Union Bench. It started as an agricultural extension of Springville.  Legal action between residents of Springville and what became Mapleton, largely over water rights, allowed Mapleton to chart its course beginning in 1901 when the community incorporated as a town.  Mapleton became a city in 1948.

Demographics

As of the census of 2000, there were 5,809 people, 1,442 households, and 1,313 families residing in the city. The population density was 629.4 people per square mile (243.0/km2). There were 1,480 housing units at an average density of 160.4 per square mile (61.9/km2). The racial makeup of the city was 97.80% White, 0.14% African American, 0.24% Native American, 0.34% Asian, 0.22% Pacific Islander, 0.52% from other races, and 0.74% from two or more races. Hispanic or Latino of any race were 2.05% of the population.

There were 1,442 households, out of which 54.1% had children under the age of 18 living with them, 83.8% were married couples living together, 5.1% had a female householder with no husband present, and 8.9% were non-families. 7.6% of all households were made up of individuals, and 3.7% had someone living alone who was 65 years of age or older. The average household size was 4.02 and the average family size was 4.25.

In the city, the population was spread out, with 40.1% under the age of 18, 10.0% from 18 to 24, 23.4% from 25 to 44, 18.7% from 45 to 64, and 7.8% who were 65 years of age or older. The median age was 25 years. For every 100 females, there were 100.9 males. For every 100 females age 18 and over, there were 101.0 males.

The median income for a household in the city was $60,985, and the median income for a family was $63,856. Males had a median income of $43,462 versus $22,800 for females. The per capita income for the city was $17,496. About 3.8% of families and 5.1% of the population were below the poverty line, including 6.7% of those under age 18 and 6.7% of those age 65 or over.

Geography

The city is dominated by  Spanish Fork Peak to the southeast and  Ether Peak to the northeast.  Between the two mountains is Maple Canyon, which is home to Whiting Campground in the Uinta-Wasatch-Cache National Forest.  Mapleton residents continue to call Spanish Fork Peak "Maple Mountain", despite the U.S. Board on Geographic Names having opted for the name that refers to the river and canyon that form its south base. The mountain has also been informally referred to as Sierra Bonita and Monument Peak. The city is bounded to the north by Hobble Creek and extends southward to the Ensign-Bickford plant in Spanish Fork. The Mapleton Lateral Canal crosses the eastern side of the city, and the Bureau of Reclamation began piping it in 2007.

Today

Mapleton is still a somewhat rural area but is rapidly suburbanizing in the wake of development. Numerous large subdivisions have been approved in recent years. None of the city touches Interstate 15, which has kept the city more rural than neighboring Springville and Spanish Fork. The main artery through town is U.S. Route 89. Mapleton uses innovative planning techniques, including Transferable Development Rights (TDRs), to preserve the foothills.

There are two restaurants in Mapleton - Subway, located at the intersection of Highway 89 and Maple Street, and Guadalajara Mexican Food, located at the intersection of Highway 89 and 800 North.

Parks include Mapleton City Park (southeast corner of Main and Maple streets), Ira Allen Park (northwest corner of 800 West and 2000 South), Eagle Rock Park (~800 South 800 East), North Park (~1400 West 1600 North), and Harvest Park (~2100 Harvest Parkway).

Other landmarks include the "Old White Church" (The Church of Jesus Christ of Latter-Day Saints) at the southwest corner of Main and Maple streets, the Pioneer Heritage Museum and Levi Kendall Log Cabin located at 115 South Main Street, the Mapleton City Offices, located at 125 West Community Center Way (400 North), and the Mapleton City Public Works Building (1405 West 1600 North).

Education

Mapleton is served by Nebo School District. Public schools in this district that serve Mapleton residents include the following:
Maple Mountain High School, located in nearby Spanish Fork
Mapleton Junior High
Hobble Creek Elementary
Mapleton Elementary
Maple Ridge Elementary
Maple Grove Middle school

Notable people
 David W. Allan, American atomic clock physicist.
 Don Bluth, maker of animated films such as An American Tail, lived in Mapleton in his youth.
 Chris Cannon, former Member of the House of Representatives in Utah's 3rd District from 1997 to 2008
 Richard Dutcher, an independent filmmaker, director, screenwriter, and actor lived in the town for several years.
 Travis Hansen, former BYU basketball player, NBA guard Atlanta Hawks, and entrepreneur (founder of Eddy, Tesani, and Sunshine Heroes Foundation).
 Wally Joyner, former Major League Baseball player with the Los Angeles Angels of Anaheim, San Diego Padres and Kansas City Royals (among others)
 Frank C. Robertson, an author best known for his over 150 western novels.  He lived in Mapleton from 1937 until his death in 1969.

Popular culture
The 2001 film Brigham City was actually filmed in Mapleton, instead of the film's namesake, Brigham City, Utah.

The Hallmark classic, A Christmas Wish, was filmed in Mapleton, Utah.

See also

 List of cities and towns in Utah

References

External links

 City of Mapleton

Cities in Utah
Cities in Utah County, Utah
Provo–Orem metropolitan area
Populated places established in 1856
1856 establishments in Utah Territory